Cockington is a village near Torquay in the English county of Devon. It has old cottages within its boundaries, and is about a half a mile away from Torquay.  Bus service 62 (Torquay circular) calls at the village five times per day (Mon-Fri) and is operated by Torbay Buses.

History 

The village was probably founded 2,500 years ago during the Iron Age with evidence of two hill forts on either side of Cockington valley. Little is known about Cockington from that point up until the remains of a small Saxon village were found near the Drum Inn. The evidence from this village shows that it was primarily a fishing and farming village. The first official documentation of the village was in the 10th century. The manor was owned by Alric the Saxon, before William Hostiarus, William de Falesia and Robert FitzMartin, who passed it down to his son Roger, who renounced his name to become Roger de Cockington. The Cockington family owned Cockington Estate from 1048–1348. The Cary family (this particular branch included George Carey (c. 1541–1616)) owned the court from 1375 to 1654. It was then sold to the Mallock family a family of rich silversmiths from Exeter, who owned it from 1654 to 1932 when they sold the estate to the Torquay Corporation.

Buildings 
There are several buildings of note in Cockington.

Cricket Pavilion and grounds 

The park which is now home to the cricket grounds was originally a medieval deer park. Cricket started to be played on it in 1947. The current cricket pavilion was built after the original burnt down in the 1990s.

Drum Inn 
The Grade II listed thatched Drum Inn is the local public house and restaurant in Cockington. Designed by Sir Edwin Lutyens, it opened in 1936 and cost £7,000 to build. Covering 522 square metres, it uses 16th century styled bricks, made in Belgium to Lutyens specifications. The two largest chimney stacks are evocative of the shape of another Lutyens creation, the Cenotaph in London. The Drum Inn occupies the site of a former sawmill and was the flagship project of Cockington Trust Ltd, who were proposing to build a new village. It was the only building they were able to complete before the village was sold in 1946. Originally intended to be called 'The Forge Inn', the name was changed as the Cockington Trust thought it might be 'Predudicial to the celebrated forge in the village'.

The pub sign depicting an Elizabethan soldier beating a drum, is attributed to be from the studio of Dame Laura Knight. The original was painted on a solid sheet of copper and today it hangs on a wall inside the pub, with a facsimile in its place outside. Sir Alan Charles Laurence Whistler, the noted poet and glass engraver presented Sir Edwin Lutyens with a poem titled 'The Drum', engraved on a glass pane that was originally placed in a lounge window. It's now framed and is on display inside the pub.

The Almshouses 
The Almshouses consist of seven terraced cottages built during the reign of King James I of England by the Cary family to house the poor and those who could not work within the village. When the Mallock family took over the Cockington estate, the almshouses fell into disrepair. They were rebuilt between 1790 and 1810.

Cockington Court 
Cockington Court was the mansion house of the Mallock family, and remains the focal point of the estate. Originally built in the 16th century, it has few architectural features remaining from then, but was altered and extended several times, particularly in 1673 by Rawlyn Mallock and about 1820 by the Rev'd Roger Mallock. He had the top floor removed and the interior remodelled. Its historical significance merits great care in maintaining its existing fabric and in ensuring new elements are sympathetically designed.

Cockington Court was built over the remains of a medieval court. A far cry from the days of the Cary family when it was an actual court, it is now filled with various arts and crafts workshops.

In her youth, Agatha Christie regularly visited Cockington. Her novel Why Didn't They Ask Evans? is dedicated to Christopher Mallock. The Mallock family were friends of Christie's from the years before her first marriage. The Mallocks staged amateur theatricals at Cockington Court, in which Christie, managing to overcome her usual crippling shyness, took part.

Other notable buildings 
 Cockington Church which has been estimated to have been standing since 1069  built by William de Falaise.
 A water mill that is in the middle of the village;
 Cockington Forge, which has been in the same place in the village for 500 years.

Notable residents 
 Robert Cary a chronologer was born in Cockington in about 1615. 
 Robert Sweet (1782-1835), an horticulturalist and author, was also born in the village.
 Patrick, a four-year-old therapy pony, was informally elected mayor in July 2022 following a publicity campaign by a local charity. He worked with recovery groups in hospitals and mental health wards and community projects some of which involved him visiting the Drum Inn, as mentioned above. About two weeks after his appointment as honorary mayor, local  health officials from the  governing authority, the  Torbay Council in responding to a complaint issued a restraining order  preventing the pony entering the inn.

In film
In 1968, British Pathé, (film reference 457.1), Sid James, Val Doonican, and Arthur Askey, were filmed playing golf in Cockington, for their production, 'Viva Torbay: Travelling to the British Seaside'. (It also featured Lionel Bart).

See also
 History of Torquay
Chelston
Cockington Green Gardens - named after Cockington, Devon.

References

External links 

 Cockington Court

Villages in Devon
Areas of Torquay
Former manors in Devon